Steven E. Jacob is an American politician serving in the Minnesota House of Representatives since 2023. A member of the Republican Party of Minnesota, Jacob represents District 20B in southeastern Minnesota, which includes the cities of Plainview, St. Charles, and Zumbrota and parts of Goodhue, Olmsted, Wabasha, and Winona Counties.

Early life, education and career 
Jacob grew up on a farm and is a fourth-generation family farmer. He served as a county commissioner for Winona County where he was a part of the Soil and Water Conservation Board, Planning Commission, and Road and Bridge Committee.

Minnesota House of Representatives 
Jacob was elected to the Minnesota House of Representatives in 2022, after redistricting and the retirement of Republican incumbent Steve Drazkowski who decided to run for a seat in the Minnesota Senate. Jacob serves on the Agriculture Finance and Policy and the Environment and Natural Resources Finance and Policy Committees.

Electoral history

Personal life 
Jacob lives in Altura, Minnesota with his wife, MaryAnn Mae, and has four children.

References

External links 

Living people
21st-century American politicians
Republican Party members of the Minnesota House of Representatives
People from Winona County, Minnesota